The Technology Centre of New Jersey is a  science park in North Brunswick Township, New Jersey, United States, established by the New Jersey Economic Development Authority as a high technology business incubator.

External links
Technology Centre of New Jersey

Buildings and structures in Middlesex County, New Jersey
Science parks in the United States
Business incubators of the United States
Economy of New Jersey
North Brunswick, New Jersey